Summit Lake is a lake in Langlade County, Wisconsin, in the United States. The community of Summit Lake is located primarily along its northern and eastern shores.

Summit Lake was named for its lofty elevation.

See also
List of lakes in Wisconsin

References

Lakes of Wisconsin
Lakes of Langlade County, Wisconsin